Ilmari Oksanen (24 December 1906, Turku – 31 January 1977, Turku) was a Finnish footballer.

He earned 5 caps at international level between 1937 and 1941.

At club level Oksanen played for TPS.

Honours

Finnish Championship: 1928, 1939, 1941, 1945

References

1906 births
1977 deaths
Finnish footballers
Finland international footballers
Turun Palloseura footballers
Footballers from Turku

Association footballers not categorized by position